The canton of Romilly-sur-Andelle is an administrative division of the Eure department, northern France. It was created at the French canton reorganisation which came into effect in March 2015. Its seat is in Romilly-sur-Andelle.

It consists of the following communes:

Amfreville-les-Champs
Bacqueville
Beauficel-en-Lyons
Bézu-la-Forêt
Bosquentin
Bouchevilliers
Bourg-Beaudouin
Charleval
Douville-sur-Andelle
Fleury-la-Forêt
Fleury-sur-Andelle
Flipou
Les Hogues
Houville-en-Vexin
Letteguives
Lilly
Lisors
Lorleau
Lyons-la-Forêt
Mainneville
Martagny
Ménesqueville
Mesnil-sous-Vienne
Perriers-sur-Andelle
Perruel
Pont-Saint-Pierre
Radepont
Renneville
Romilly-sur-Andelle
Rosay-sur-Lieure
Touffreville
Le Tronquay
Val d'Orger
Vandrimare
Vascœuil

References

Cantons of Eure